Sjona Church is a parish church of the Church of Norway in Rana Municipality in Nordland county, Norway. It is located in the village of Myklebustad. It is the church for the Sjona parish which is part of the Indre Helgeland prosti (deanery) in the Diocese of Sør-Hålogaland. The white, wooden church was built in a long church style in 1896 using plans drawn up by an unknown architect. The church seats about 170 people.

History
The building was first constructed in 1896 to serve as a local prayer house. In 1916, the church was consecrated as an annex chapel. In 2003, the chapel was upgraded to full parish church status.

Media gallery

See also
List of churches in Sør-Hålogaland

References

Rana, Norway
Churches in Nordland
Wooden churches in Norway
19th-century Church of Norway church buildings
Churches completed in 1896
1896 establishments in Norway
Long churches in Norway